Franklin is a town in Manitowoc County, Wisconsin, United States. The population was 1,293 at the 2000 census. The unincorporated communities of Menchalville and Taus are located in the town. The unincorporated communities of Maple Grove and Reifs Mills are also located partially in the town.

Geography
According to the United States Census Bureau, the town has a total area of 36.2 square miles (93.7 km2), of which, 36.2 square miles (93.7 km2) of it is land and 0.04 square miles (0.1 km2) of it (0.06%) is water.

Demographics
As of the census of 2000, there were 1,293 people, 469 households, and 355 families residing in the town. The population density was 35.8 people per square mile (13.8/km2).  There were 491 housing units at an average density of 13.6 per square mile (5.2/km2). The racial makeup of the town was 99.61% White, 0.08% Native American, 0.08% Asian, and 0.23% from two or more races. Hispanic or Latino of any race were 0.85% of the population.

There were 469 households, out of which 35.8% had children under the age of 18 living with them, 65.5% were married couples living together, 5.8% had a female householder with no husband present, and 24.3% were non-families. 19.8% of all households were made up of individuals, and 5.8% had someone living alone who was 65 years of age or older. The average household size was 2.76 and the average family size was 3.19.

In the town, the population was spread out, with 27.8% under the age of 18, 6.5% from 18 to 24, 30.7% from 25 to 44, 25.4% from 45 to 64, and 9.5% who were 65 years of age or older. The median age was 38 years. For every 100 females, there were 107.2 males. For every 100 females age 18 and over, there were 109.7 males.

The median income for a household in the town was $50,000, and the median income for a family was $53,056. Males had a median income of $36,474 versus $26,050 for females. The per capita income for the town was $19,602. About 4.3% of families and 7.6% of the population were below the poverty line, including 12.1% of those under age 18 and 4.9% of those age 65 or over.

References

Towns in Manitowoc County, Wisconsin
Towns in Wisconsin